Francisco Solé may refer to:

 Francisco Solé (footballer) (born 1997), Argentine footballer
 Francisco Solé (wrestler) (1900–?), Spanish wrestler